Fire Place was a station stop on the Main Line of the Long Island Rail Road. Fire Place opened on June 26, 1844 with the opening of the LIRR to the temporary terminal near Carman's River. The station was removed from the timetable for June 14, 1845, coinciding with the opening of St. George's Manor station, Riverhead station, Mattituck and Southold.

References

Former Long Island Rail Road stations in Suffolk County, New York
Brookhaven, New York
Railway stations in the United States opened in 1844